Crivello is an Italian surname. Notable people with the surname include:

Anthony Crivello (born 1955), American actor and singer
Max Crivello (born 1958), Italian artist, illustrator, and cartoonist
Roberto Crivello (born 1991), Italian footballer

See also
20690 Crivello, a main-belt asteroid

Italian-language surnames